Fabian Knežević (born 4 December 1987) is a Canadian-Croatian footballer who played in the Croatian First Football League, Croatian Third Football League, and the Canadian Soccer League.

Career 
Knežević began his career with NK Kamen Ingrad, where he played in his first two professionals games in the Prva HNL, and signed than a contract with HNK Šibenik in summer 2007. After one year with the reserve of HNK Šibenik was loaned out to NK Zagora Unešić for one season in August 2008. He was subsequently loaned to HNK Primorac in the Croatian Third Football League. In 2011, he returned to his hometown to sign with London City in the Canadian Soccer League.

References

1987 births
Living people
Association football goalkeepers
Canadian people of Croatian descent
Canadian Soccer League (1998–present) players
Canadian soccer players
Canadian expatriate soccer players
Croatian Football League players
HNK Šibenik players
London City players
NK Kamen Ingrad players
Soccer players from London, Ontario